The Duchy League is a football competition based in the eastern half of Cornwall, United Kingdom, but also includes a few sides from over the border in Devon. The League was formed in 1965 as a merger of the Liskeard & District League and the St. Austell & District League. It has three divisions headed by the Duchy League Premier Division, which sits at level 13 of the English football league system. It is a feeder to the East Cornwall League. In 2014–15, Padstow United won the Premier Division, and earned promotion to the East Cornwall League.

Cup competitions
The 2015–16 season saw the Duchy League run three cup competitions: the KMD Developments Cup; Bodmin Sports Trophies Duchy League Cup and the TJ International Reserve Team Cup. The KMD Developments Cup has the top 32 teams from the previous seasons league positions take part in a knockout cup competition, with the semi-finals and final played on neutral grounds. The Bodmin Sports Trophies Duchy League Cup sees the rest of the teams compete in a similar knockout competition whilst the TJ International Reserve Team Cup is a competition for clubs who have a second team in the Duchy Leagues. In 2014–15, St. Stephen of the Premier Division won the KMD Developments Cup; Veryan won the Bodmin Sports Trophies Duchy League Cup (as well as winning Division Three) and the Reserve Cup was won by Grampound Reserves.

Member clubs 2022–23

Premier Division
Bodmin Town Reserves
Boscastle
Dobwalls Reserves
Gorran
Lanivet Inn
Lifton
Lostwithiel
Mevagissey
Polzeath
St Breward
St Dominick Reserves
St Merryn
Saltash United 3rds
Southgate Seniors

Division One
Biscovey
Boscastle Reserves
Calstock
Foxhole Stars Reserves
Gerrans & St Mawes United
Gunnislake Reserves
Holywell & Cubert
Looe Town Reserves
North Petherwin Reserves
Pensilva
St Cleer
St Mawgan Reserves
St Minver Reserves

Division Two
Bodmin Dragons
Bude Town Reserves
Castle Loyale
Delabole & Tintagel
Godolphin Atlantic (Newquay) Reserves
Grampound
Indian Queens
Lanreath
Lifton Reserves
Lostwithiel Reserves
North Hill
St Eval Spitfires
Week St Mary

Recent divisional champions

External links

 Official website

 
4
Sports leagues established in 1965